Emanuele Zuelli (born 22 November 2001) is an Italian professional footballer who plays as a midfielder for  club Pisa.

Club career

Early career
Zuelli began his youth career at Neugries at age of five, before joining Bolzano, Südtirol in 2008 and then Gherdëina in 2011. In January 2014, he moved to Chievo's youth sector.

Chievo Verona
On 23 January 2020, Zuelli signed his first professional contract with Chievo until 30 June 2024. He made his Serie B debut on 23 February 2020, in a game against Pordenone. He substituted Joel Obi in the 73rd minute.

Juventus
On 9 August 2021, Zuelli moved to Juventus U23 on a two-year contract. On 22 August, Zuelli made his debut for Juventus in a 3–2 Coppa Italia Serie C win against Pro Sesto. On 10 April 2022, Zuelli scored his first goal in his career in a 2–1 win against Renate. On 24 April, Zuelli was first called-up by the first team for a match against Sassuolo.

Pisa
On 31 January 2023, Zuelli joined Serie B club Pisa on a permanent deal.

International career
Zuelli was called up to represent Italy for the first time in February 2020 for the under-19 squad friendly against Switzerland.

Career statistics

Club

References

Notelist

External links
 
 

2001 births
Living people
Sportspeople from Merano
Footballers from Trentino-Alto Adige/Südtirol
Italian footballers
Italy youth international footballers
Association football midfielders
F.C. Bolzano 1996 players
A.C. ChievoVerona players
Juventus Next Gen players
Pisa S.C. players
Serie B players
Serie C players